Mesosa pontianakensis is a species of beetle in the family Cerambycidae. It was described by Stephan von Breuning in 1967. It is known from Borneo.

References

pontianakensis
Beetles described in 1967